Rashid Bel Aziz (born 2 November 1967) is a Moroccan wrestler. He competed in the men's Greco-Roman 130 kg at the 1996 Summer Olympics.

References

1967 births
Living people
Moroccan male sport wrestlers
Olympic wrestlers of Morocco
Wrestlers at the 1996 Summer Olympics
Place of birth missing (living people)
20th-century Moroccan people